Charles Emmott (birth registered first ¼ 1869 – 27 March 1927) was an English rugby union footballer who played in the 1890s. He played at representative level for England, and at club level for Bradford F.C., as a half-back, e.g. scrum-half, or fly-half, i.e. number 9, or 10. Prior to Tuesday 27 August 1895, Bradford F.C. was a rugby union club, it then became a rugby league club, and since 1907 it has been the association football (soccer) club Bradford Park Avenue.

Background
Charles Emmott's birth was registered in Bradford district, West Riding of Yorkshire, and he died aged 58 in Saltaire, Bradford, West Riding of Yorkshire.

Playing career

International honours
Charles Emmott won a cap for England while at Bradford F.C. in 1892 against Wales.

Change of Code
When Bradford F.C. converted from the rugby union code to the rugby league code on Tuesday 27 August 1895, Charles Emmott would have been approximately 26. Consequently, he may have been both a rugby union and rugby league footballer for Bradford F.C.

References

External links
Search for "Emmott" at rugbyleagueproject.org
Search for "Charles Emmott" at britishnewspaperarchive.co.uk

1869 births
1927 deaths
Bradford F.C. players
England international rugby union players
English rugby union players
Rugby union halfbacks
Rugby union players from Bradford